Jeevana Poratam is a 1986 Indian Telugu-language film directed by Rajachandra. It stars Sobhan Babu and Rajinikanth as brothers.

Synopsis
Jeevana Poratam is a story about the mismanagement and selfishness of the leaders of India. Many people had striven for the independence of the country, but when we got independence, the scenario was totally opposite. Bharath (Sobhan Babu) has become the victim. In spite of being a gold medalist, he had to suffer unemployment. His father Gummadi always scolds him for this. He has 2 brothers, Rajni and Naresh and a sister. Rajinikanth joins hands with bad people and knowing this, Sobhan babu scolds him and Rajinikanth disappears and comes in the end after joining the army (he loses is hand in war). Vijayasanthi and Sobhan are related and love each other. Meanwhile, Vijayasanthi gets a job in Sarat babu's office and Sarat babu loves her. Vijaysanthi slowly falls for Sarat Babu seeing his wealth and neglects Sobhan Babu. She even gets engaged to Sarat Babu. At this time, Radhika enters his life. Due to circumstances, Sobhan Babu joins hands with Rao Gopalrao and becomes rich. Rajinikanth comes at this time and helps his brother to leave the bad people and everything ends well with Vijayasanthi losing her life in the course.

Cast
 Sobhan Babu as Bharath
 Rajinikanth as Ravi, Bharath's brother
 Naresh
 Vijayashanti
 Raadhika
 Urvashi
 Sarath Babu
 Kaikala Satyanarayana
 P. L. Narayana
 Suthi Velu
 Prasad Babu
 Pushpalata
 Sri Lakshmi
 Devi

References

External links 
 

1986 films
Films scored by K. Chakravarthy
Telugu remakes of Hindi films
1980s Telugu-language films
Films directed by Rajachandra